Could It Be may refer to:

 "Could It Be" (Georgina & Paul Giordimaina song), 1991 Eurovision Song Contest entry
 "Could It Be" (Charlie Worsham song)
 "Could It Be", song by the Bee Gees, from The Bee Gees Sing and Play 14 Barry Gibb Songs
 "Could It Be",  2000 single by Jahiem from the album Ghetto Love
 "Could It Be", song by Staind from 14 Shades of Grey
"Could It Be", a song by Christy Romano from Kim Possible Movie: So the Drama.